Central America is a region containing seven countries that connects the two continents of North America and South America.

Hurricanes by country

Belize 

Belize is a low-lying country in Central America, with a population of about 383,000 people. Throughout history, Belize has been impacted by hundreds of tropical cyclones. The most recent hurricane to impact Belize was Hurricane Nana (2020).

Since records began in 1851, only two hurricanes have had 
Category 5 hurricane strength and have hit or hit close to Belize: Hurricane Janet in 1955 and Hurricane Dean in 2007.

Costa Rica 

Costa Rica (English: Rich Coast), officially the Republic of Costa Rica, is a country in Central America, bordered by Nicaragua to the north, the Caribbean Sea to the northeast, Panama to the southeast, the Pacific Ocean to the southwest, and Ecuador to the south of Cocos Island. It has a population of around 5 million in a land area of 51,060 square kilometers (19,714 square miles). Hurricanes are uncommon in this country; only eighteen have been recorded in history.

Climatologically, the hurricanes that impact Costa Rica mostly form in October and November. However, most of the hurricanes that hit the country were deadly and destructive, such as Hurricane Nate in 2017. Instituto Meteorológico Nacional (IMN) is the national meteorological agency of Costa Rica.

El Salvador 
El Salvador is rarely affected by hurricanes, though Tropical Storm Agatha caused heavy rains and flooding in 2010.

Guatemala 
Guatemala

Honduras 

Honduras, officially the Republic of Honduras, is a country in Central America. To the north of Honduras are Guatemala and Belize, to the south is Nicaragua, to the west is El Salvador, and to the east is the Caribbean Sea.

Nicaragua 

Nicaragua, officially the Republic of Nicaragua, is the largest country in the Central American isthmus, bordered by Honduras to the northwest, the Caribbean Sea to the east, Costa Rica to the south, and the Pacific Ocean to the southwest. Tropical cyclones are common in the country, with an average of one storm a year. The coast is especially subject to destructive tropical storms and hurricanes, particularly from July through October. The high winds and floods accompanying these storms often cause considerable destruction of property. Hurricanes or heavy rains in the central highlands where agriculture is prevalent have destroyed much of the natural vegetation, causing considerable crop damage and soil erosion. One of the deadliest hurricanes to hit Nicaragua was Hurricane Mitch in 1998, which killed thousands.

Panama 

Panama (Spanish: Panamá), officially the Republic of Panama (Spanish: República de Panamá), is a transcontinental country in Central America and South America, bordered by Costa Rica to the west, Colombia to the southeast, the Caribbean Sea to the north, and the Pacific Ocean to the south. Hurricanes are not common in Panama, as the country is outside of the Hurricane Belt. However, several destructive hurricanes have hit the country in the past.

References 

 Hurricanes in Central America